John Andrew MacPherson (1856 – 21 July 1944) was a New Zealand politician of the Liberal Party and the United Party.

Political career

He unsuccessfully contested the  electorate in the  against the incumbent, Thomas Young Duncan.

He represented the Mount Ida electorate from 1905 to 1908, when he was defeated standing for the replacement electorate of Tuapeka.

In 1922 he won the Oamaru electorate from Ernest Lee. The election was declared void, but MacPherson won the subsequent by-election.

Lee won the electorate back from MacPherson in the 1925 general election, but again lost it to MacPherson in the 1928 general election. MacPherson then held it until 1935, when he was defeated by Labour's Arnold Nordmeyer.

In 1935, he was awarded the King George V Silver Jubilee Medal.

MacPherson died on 21 July 1944.

References

1856 births
1944 deaths
New Zealand Liberal Party MPs
United Party (New Zealand) MPs
Unsuccessful candidates in the 1935 New Zealand general election
Unsuccessful candidates in the 1925 New Zealand general election
Unsuccessful candidates in the 1899 New Zealand general election
Unsuccessful candidates in the 1902 New Zealand general election
Unsuccessful candidates in the 1908 New Zealand general election
Unsuccessful candidates in the 1919 New Zealand general election
Members of the New Zealand House of Representatives
New Zealand MPs for South Island electorates
19th-century New Zealand politicians
20th-century New Zealand politicians